James Hooker may refer to:
 James Hooker (New York politician), American lawyer and politician from New York.
 James Benjamin Hooker, farmer and political figure in Saskatchewan
 James Hooker (musician), American musician
 J. Murray Hooker, lawyer and U.S. Representative from Virginia